Mary Carolynn Tucker (born 20 July, 2001 in Pineville, North Carolina) is an American sport shooter. She won silver in the 10m air rifle mixed at the 2020 Tokyo Olympic Games. Previously she has won gold at the 2021 ISSF World Cup in the 10 metre air rifle. She also won a silver medal in 10 metre air rifle team women and a bronze medal in 10m air rifle mixed team in the ISSF World Cup 2021, New Delhi. After the games she took home 6 medals from the Junior World Championships and the 10 meter air rifle championship from the 2021 Pan American Games. Tucker is right handed and is right eye dominant.

After completing high school at Sarasota Military Academy she enrolled at the University of Kentucky (UK). Tucker qualified for the U.S. Olympic team in February 2020 for Tokyo Olympics in air rifle. In March 2021, she led UK to the NCAA rifle team championship, winning individual titles in both contested disciplines of air rifle and smallbore. She has since doubled the NCAA team championship as well as winning overall high performer for the second straight year.

References

External links
 

Living people
2001 births
American female sport shooters
Kentucky Wildcats rifle shooters

People from Pineville, North Carolina
Olympic shooters of the United States
Shooters at the 2020 Summer Olympics
Olympic silver medalists for the United States in shooting
Medalists at the 2020 Summer Olympics
21st-century American women